VfL 93 Hamburg is a German association football club from the city of Hamburg.

The club's greatest success has been to earn promotion to the tier three Regionalliga Nord, where it played for three seasons between 1994 and 1998.

History
Formed in 1893, VfL played for much of its history as a local amateur club before making a brief appearance in the Landesliga Hamburg, then the highest league in the state of Hamburg, from 1973 to 1975. The club began its rise through the league system once more in the late 1980s when a local Bezirksliga championship in 1989 took the team up to the tier five Landesliga Hamburg-Hansa. In this league it immediately won another championship and earned promotion to the Hamburg's highest league, the Verbandsliga Hamburg. The team became a dominant side at this level, too but missed out on a third consecutive promotion in 1991 despite winning the league. The following season it finished runners-up but, this time, was promoted. The club played the next two seasons in the tier three Oberliga Nord, finishing eleventh on both occasions. The later one, in 1994, qualified the team for the newly introduced Regionalliga Nord, the new third tier in Northern Germany.

VfL played three seasons in the Regionalliga, finishing twelfth in 1995 but being relegated the season after when it came only sixteenth. Back in the Oberliga, now the Oberliga Hamburg/Schleswig-Holstein, the club won promotion back to the Regionalliga. The 1997–98 season became the club's best at this level, finishing eleventh but choosing to withdraw from the league at the end of season.

VfL stepped down two levels, entering the Verbandsliga for the 1998–99 season. It dropped another level after being relegated in 1999, won promotion back up in 2000 and played in the Verbandsliga for the next six season until a league title took it back up to the re-introduced Oberliga Nord. VfL dropped from this level back to the Verbandsliga and stayed in the league for another season when it was renamed to Oberliga Hamburg after the Oberliga Nord was disbanded again in 2008. The club dropped from there as far as the tier seven Bezirksliga, recovered and won the Landesliga Hamburg-Hammonia in 2014 but instead of taking up promotion to the Oberliga opted to drop down to the tier nine Kreisklasse, where its reserve team previously played.

A league championship in the Kreisklasse in 2015–16 took the club back up to the Kreisliga Hamburg.

Honours
The team's honours:
Oberliga Hamburg/Schleswig-Holstein
 Champions:  1997
Verbandsliga Hamburg
 Champions:  1991
 Runners-up: 1992
Landesliga Hamburg-Hansa
 Champions:  1990
Landesliga Hamburg-Hammonia
 Champions:  2000, 2014
Hamburg Cup
 Runners-up:  1990, 1994, 1997, 2007

Recent seasons
The recent season-by-season performance of the club:

 With the introduction of the Regionalligas in 1994 and the 3. Liga in 2008 as the new third tier, below the 2. Bundesliga, all leagues below dropped one tier. The Verbandsliga Hamburg became the Oberliga Hamburg after the Oberliga Nord was disbanded in 2008.

References

External links
  

Football clubs in Hamburg
Association football clubs established in 1893
1893 establishments in Germany
German workers' football clubs